Barton Blount is a civil parish in the South Derbyshire district of Derbyshire, England.  The parish contains seven listed buildings that are recorded in the National Heritage List for England.  Of these, one is listed at Grade II*, the middle of the three grades, and the others are at Grade II, the lowest grade. The parish contains the small village of Barton Blount and is otherwise rural.  The most important building in the parish is Barton Hall, which is listed, together with associated buildings, including a chapel.  The other listed buildings are farmhouses and outbuildings.


Key

Buildings

References

Citations

Sources

 

Lists of listed buildings in Derbyshire